Antonio Lapenna (born 17 October 1960 in Rome) is an Italian former wrestler who competed in the 1980 Summer Olympics and in the 1984 Summer Olympics.

References

External links
 

1960 births
Living people
Sportspeople from Rome
Olympic wrestlers of Italy
Wrestlers at the 1980 Summer Olympics
Wrestlers at the 1984 Summer Olympics
Italian male sport wrestlers
20th-century Italian people
21st-century Italian people